Richard Merrill Atkinson (February 6, 1894 – April 29, 1947) was an American politician and a U.S. Representative from Tennessee.

Biography
Atkinson was born in Nashville, Tennessee, and attended the public schools. He graduated from Wallace University School, Nashville, Tennessee, in 1912, from Vanderbilt University, Nashville, Tennessee, in 1916, and from Cumberland School of Law at Cumberland University, Lebanon, Tennessee, in 1917. Admitted to the bar in 1917, he commenced the practice of law in Nashville, in 1920.

During the First World War, Atkinson served from June 30, 1917, until honorably discharged on August 29, 1919. He was a member of the Forty-seventh Company, United States Marine Corps, Second Division, serving in France with the American Expeditionary Forces. He served as Attorney general of the tenth judicial circuit of Tennessee from September 1, 1926, to September 1, 1934. He was also State commissioner of Smoky Mountain National Park from 1931 to 1933.

Atkinson was elected as a Democrat to the Seventy-fifth Congress, and served from January 3, 1937, to January 3, 1939. He was an unsuccessful candidate for renomination in 1938, and returned to the practice of law in Nashville, Tennessee, until his death.

Death
Atkinson died in Nashville, Davidson County, Tennessee, on April 29, 1947. He is interred at Spring Hill Cemetery, Madison, Tennessee.

References

External links 

1894 births
1947 deaths
United States Marines
Politicians from Nashville, Tennessee
Democratic Party members of the United States House of Representatives from Tennessee
20th-century American politicians
United States Marine Corps personnel of World War I